Khun Ying Patama Leeswadtrakul (born February 16, 1965) is a Thai businesswoman, and sports administrator. She is the chairperson of Arnoma Grand in Pathum Wan, Bangkok, and Felix River Kwai in Kanchanaburi, and managing director of GSTEL. She is also a senior expert director of Thailand Institute of Justice, and Office of Contemporary Art and Culture in National Council for Peace and Order era. As sports administrator, She is a member of the International Olympic Committee, a deputy president of Badminton World Federation, an executive member of Olympic Council of Asia and National Olympic Committee of Thailand, and the president of Badminton Association of Thailand Under Royal Patronage of His Majesty the King.

Early life and education
Patama Leeswadtrakul was born in 1965 in Bangkok, Thailand. Patama study in primary and secondary at St. Francis Xavier Convent School and then Assumption Commercial School, she studies in Bachelor of Economics and Bachelor of Business Administration at Ramkhamhaeng University. In Master degree at The University of Manchester in Master of Science Human Resource Development and Honorary Doctorate degree at Philosophy Administration Program from Ramkhamhaeng University.

References

1965 births
Living people
Patama Leeswadtrakul
Patama Leeswadtrakul
Patama Leeswadtrakul
Patama Leeswadtrakul
International Olympic Committee members
Patama Leeswadtrakul